The Fifth National Industrial Exhibition was held in Osaka in 1903. It was the first to be open to foreign exhibitors, and twice the size of previous National Industrial Exhibitions.

Summary
The fair ran from 1 March 1903 until 31 July, with formal opening by the emperor on 20 April. It was held in the location now occupied by Tennōji Zoo, Tennōji Park. There were 4,350,693 visitors; 959,516 additionally visited the aquarium, which cost extra. This was the largest event held in Japan to date.

The buildings were destroyed after the fair, and the Tennōji Park established there.

Participants
The 47 Japanese prefectures all participated, as did 16 counties and colonies. Countries included 
Belgium,
China,
France, Germany, the United Kingdom, and the United States.

Pavilions
In the entertainment section, there was a theatre, a tower with a lift, a Mystery Building,  and a two storey wooden Human Pavilion. The Human Pavilion exhibited Ainu, Okinawan, and Korean people, in addition to people from Africa, India and the Malay peninsula, who cost 10 sen more to attend.

The Aichi prefecture building was built to look like a castle.

The Formosan pavilion aimed to celebrate Japanese colonial rule, but it wasn't of much interest to Japanese people. Two buildings were moved from the island to provide a shrine of Prince Kitashirakawa and a Bugaku dance stage.

External links
 Aichi prefecture pavilion

References

World's fairs in Osaka
1903 in Japan
Events in Osaka